Rho GTPase activating protein 26 (ARHGAP26) also known as GTPase Regulator Associated with Focal Adhesion Kinase (GRAF) is a protein that in humans is encoded by the ARHGAP26 gene.

Function 
GRAF1 is a multidomain protein that is necessary for the CLIC/GEEC endocytic pathway.  By virtue of an N-terminal BAR domain, GRAF1 sculpts the endocytic membranes of this pathway into 40 nm diameter tubules and vesicles that allow uptake of extracellular fluid, GPI-linked proteins and certain bacterial exotoxins into cells.  The role of dynamin in the CLIC/GEEC pathway is controversial, but GRAF1 interacts strongly with this protein and acute inhibition of dynamin action abrogates CLIC/GEEC endocytosis.  There are several members of the GRAF family of proteins, including GRAF2, GRAF3, and oligophrenin, all of which likely playing similar roles during clathrin-independent endocytic events.  Mutations of both GRAF1 and oligophrenin are strongly implicated in causing human disease (leukaemia and mental retardation, respectively). Recently, autoantibodies to ARHGAP26 have been implicated in autoimmune cerebellar ataxia.

Interactions 

ARHGAP26 has been shown to interact with PKN3.

References

Further reading

External links 
ARHGAP26 Info with links in the Cell Migration Gateway